Trochospongilla is a genus of sponges belonging to the family Spongillidae.

The genus has almost cosmopolitan distribution.

Species:

Trochospongilla amazonica 
Trochospongilla delicata 
Trochospongilla gregaria

References

Spongillidae
Sponge genera